Chera Perumals of Makotai, also known as the Perumal dynasty of Kerala, or Cheraman Perumal dynasty of Mahodayapuram, (fl. c. 9th–12th century CE) were a ruling dynasty in present-day Kerala, south India. Makotai, or Mahodayapuram, the seat of the Cheraman Perumals, is identified with present-day Kodungallur in central Kerala. Initially, their influence appeared limited to the area between present-day Quilon and Quilandy, but later extended to up to Chandragiri river in north Kerala and to Nagercoil in the south.

The medieval Cheras claimed that they were descended from the Cheras who flourished in pre-Pallava (early historic) south India. The exact relationship between the medieval Chera rulers of present-day Kerala and that of western Tamil country is not known to scholars. The Chera Perumals are often described as the members of Surya Vamsa (the Solar Race).

The Chera Perumal kingdom derived most of its wealth from maritime trade relations (the spice trade) with the Middle East. The port of Kollam, in the kingdom, was a major point in overseas India trade to the West and the East Asia. [ settlements of agriculturally rich areas (fertile wet land) were another major source of support to the Makotai kingdom in the Periyar Valley. The Cheraman Perumals are known for employing a single script (Vattezhuthu with Grantha characters) and language (early form of Malayalam) in all of their records in Kerala.

Historiography 

 An earlier version of conventional Kerala historiography had believed that the "Second/Later Chera Empire", or "Kulasekhara Empire" was a highly centralized monarchy (unitary or imperial state model, emphasising centralised administration). Modern scholars have accused early Kerala historians of inventing a "Second Chera Empire" to rival the glories of the imperial Cholas.
 However, critical research in the late 1960s and early 1970s offered a major corrective to this (a monarchy supported by a Brahmin oligarchy). The theories of a Chera "empire", propounded by the early writers, were rejected. It was also discovered that the Chera kings did not bear the specific abhisekanama "Kulasekhara". Some recent scholarship also proposes a gradual transition from 'a monarchy' to a 'ritual monarchy'. They question the general inclination to treat the three centuries of Chera Perumal rule as a "single historical block".
Suggestions pointing to the other extreme, that the king at Kodungallur had only a "ritual sovereignty" and the actual political power rested with "a bold and visible Brahmin oligarchy" has also emerged. It describes "a fragmented array of local chiefdoms ... held in check by a loose Tamil hegemony".

According to the third model, the power of the Perumal was restricted to the capital Makotai (Kodungallur). His kingship was only ritual and remained nominal compared with the power that local chieftains (the udaiyavar) exercised politically and militarily. Brahmins also possessed huge authority in religious and social subjects ('ritual sovereignty combined with a bold and visible Brahmin oligarchy').

Index to Chera inscriptions 
An index of most of the so-called Chera Perumal inscriptions can be found in 'Perumals of Kerala' (1972) by M. G. S. Narayanan. This general catalogue lists records discovered till 1972 (some of the recently discovered inscriptions remain unreported and undeciphered).

History

The Chera Perumals of Makotai claimed that they were descended from the Cheras who flourished in pre-Pallava (early historic) south India. There are clear indications as to how different branches of the Chera family managed different centres of power in Kerala and Tamil Nadu in the early Tamil poems.

The Chera/Perumal dynasty introduced rule through kingship in Kerala (a departure from the early historic system of clan-based societies). It is speculated that there was little economic pressure on the Kerala rulers for territorial conquest, the region being naturally rich and obtaining income from the trade with the Middle East. The Perumal kingdom had alternating friendly or hostile relations with the Cholas and the Pandyas. The kingdom was attacked, and eventually forced into submission, by the Cholas in the early 11th century CE (in order to break the monopoly of trade with the Middle East).
The Perumal kingship remained nominal compared with the power that local chieftains, the so-called "nattu-udaiyavar" or "nadu-vazhumavar", exercised politically and militarily. Chiefdoms under Chera Perumal rule, known as "", are roughly comparable to the "rashtra" under the Rashtrakutas and "padi" under the Cholas. These chieftains wielded militaristic authority over their country (even over the Brahmin temples and settlements in the nadu). The udaiyavar chieftains were liable to serve the Chera Perumal in battles (against invading Pandyas and Cholas) and the chiefdoms functioned as revenue collection units for the Chera kingdom. The Chera Perumal only held direct authority over the country that extended from Palakkad to Vembanad Lake, including the port of Kodungallur.

Bhakti saints Cheraman Perumal Nayanar and Kulasekhara Alvar are generally identified as Perumal kings of Kerala. Shankaracharya, founder of the Vedanta advaita, is also traced to 8th century Kerala. Copper-plate charters of the Perumals show grants to Jewish and Christian merchants of West Asia. The West Asian Muslims had also established themselves as traders in the kingdom. Merchant guilds such as manigramam, and anjuvannam were active in the Perumal kingdom. The origin of the Malayalam language is also dated to the Chera Perumal period in Kerala. Temple architecture style known as "Kerala-Dravida" can be seen from the 11th century CE.

In the 12th century, the Perumal kingdom was dissolved into several local powers. The Perumal dynasty was succeeded in south Kerala (Venad) by the Kulasekhara dynasty (whose kings were also known as the Cheras). In other parts of Kerala, chieftains of Kolathunad, Kozhikode and Kochi succeeded the Perumals.

Organs of the Perumal state 

Koyil Adhikarikal or Ala Koyil was the Chera royal appointed to a chiefdom. The managers of the four Nambudiri-Brahmin temples around Kodungallur, known as the Nalu Thali, acted as Chera Perumal's permanent council or ministers.

The Thousand or the Ayiram were the personal Nair protection guards of the Chera Perumal king (related to the Kodungallur Bhagavathi Temple). They functioned as the 'companions of honour' of the Perumal. Padai-nayakar or Padai-nair was the commander of the armed forces of the kingdom or a chiefdom. The Hundred multiple generally indicated the number of households in the nadu that could join the militia. They functioned as the 'companions of honour' of the udaiyavar. Prakrithi was a body of non-Brahmin or Vellala notables assisting the udaiyavar. The Adhikarar were the temple or royal servants involved in management and collection of dues or a local arbitrator.

Major chieftaincies 
Through the analysis of the medieval Kerala inscriptions relating to the Chera Perumal period, scholars have substantiated the existence of several chieftaincies. From north to south, they are as follows: Kolla-desam (or) Kolathu-nadu (proposed name), Purakizha-nadu, Kurumporai-nadu, Erala-nadu, Valluva-nadu, Kizhmalai-nadu (the Eastern Hill Country), Vempala-nadu, Munji-nadu, Nanruzhai-nadu and Venadu or Kupaka (Kollam).

Kolathu-nadu came under the influence of the Perumals during the 11th century and Venadu was probably formed under the influence of the Perumals during the early 9th century. The  Perumal held direct authority over the country that extended from Palakkad to Vembanad Lake (including Kodungallur in the Periyar Valley).

Chera Perumal genealogy

Abhisekanama 
An earlier version of conventional Kerala historiography had believed that the kings of the "Second/Later Chera Empire", or "Kulasekhara Empire" borne the specific abhisekanama "Kulasekhara" (hence "Kulasekhara dynasty"). However, critical research in the late 1960s and early 1970s offered a major corrective to this. The theories of a Chera "empire", propounded by the early writers, were rejected.

It was also discovered that the Chera Permal kings did not bear the specific abhisekanama "Kulasekhara".

Chera Perumal genealogy 
Corrected by M. G. S. Narayanan (1972) from E. P. N. Kunjan Pillai (1963) Recent corrections (2014 and 2020) on Narayanan are also employed.

Chera Perumal epigraphic records

See also 

 Jewish copper plates of Cochin (early 11th century CE)
 Quilon Syrian copper plates (9th century CE)

References 

Chera dynasty
Dynasties of India
Hindu dynasties
Kingdoms of Kerala
Empires and kingdoms of India
History of Kerala
States and territories disestablished in the 12th century
12th-century disestablishments in India